Following Herreys' victory in the previous year, Sweden were the hosts of the Eurovision Song Contest 1985. The venue chosen for the show was the country's second city, Gothenburg.

In order to save money for the staging of the Eurovision Song Contest itself, the competition to select Sweden's national entry, Melodifestivalen, was a low-budget version in 1985.

Of the ten entries, five went through to a second round, which was won by the song "Bra vibrationer", written by Lasse Holm and Ingela "Pling" Forsman and sung by Kikki Danielsson. Kikki had already represented Sweden three years earlier, as part of the pop group Chips. The other half, Elisabeth Andreassen, went to win for Norway, alongside the group Bobbysocks.

Before Eurovision

Melodifestivalen 1985
Melodifestivalen 1985 was the selection for the 25th song to represent Sweden at the Eurovision Song Contest. It was the 24th time that this system of picking a song had been used. 90 songs were submitted to SVT for the competition. The final was held at the SVT Studios in Malmö on 2 March 1985, and was broadcast on TV1 but was not broadcast on radio. The presenter, Eva Andersson, was the 1980 Miss Sweden. No orchestra was used, as all songs were performed to backing track. There have been claims that this was because SVT could not afford to hire the orchestra for two shows, as they were hosting the Eurovision Song Contest in 1985.

Seventeen-year-old Pernilla Wahlgren, singing "Piccadilly Circus", was the favourite to win. However, she finished 4th and the following day Lasse Anrell from Swedish newspaper Expressen was "angry". 85% of the Expressen readers who phoned afterwards said that "the wrong song" won.

Kikki Danielsson won with the song "Bra vibrationer", which throughout the years has become something of a signature song. This was the fourth victory in a row for Bert Karlsson's label Mariann Grammofon AB. Five of the songs were, alone or not, written by Ingela 'Pling' Forsman and Monica Forsberg.

Voting

At Eurovision
For the final Sweden performed in 16th position, or fourth from last. It did very well in the voting and came third with 103 points, 20 points behind the winner.

Voting

References

External links
TV broadcastings at SVT's open archive

1985
Countries in the Eurovision Song Contest 1985
1985
Eurovision
Eurovision